Kaadu Pookkunna Neram (English: When the Forest Bloom) is a 2016 Indian Malayalam film written and directed by Dr. Biju. The film is produced by Sophia Paul under the film production house, Weekend Blockbusters. It stars Indrajith Sukumaran as a policeman, who is sent into deep jungles to capture the chief of a radical organization, played by Rima Kallingal, but instead finds himself trapped in it.

Kaadu Pookkunna Neram premiered at the Montreal World Film Festival in September 2016.

Cast 
 Indrajith Sukumaran
 Rima Kallingal
 Prakash Bare
 Indrans as School Master
 Irshad
 Krishnan Balakrishnan
 Gopan Karunagapally
 Jayachandran Kadambanad

Release 
Kaadu Pookkunna Neram premiered at the Montreal World Film Festival in September 2016. ON 8 September 2016, it was announced as the only Indian film to be screened at Eurasia Film Festival.

Awards 
Winner Special Jury Award at Bangalore International Film Festival, India, February 2017
National Film Awards 2016 - 
 Best Sound Designer : Jayadevan Chakkadeth 
Kerala State Film Awards 2016 - 
 Best Cinematography : MJ Radhakrishnan
 Best Location sync Sound recordist : Jayadevan Chakkadeth
 Best Sound Mixing : Pramod Thomas
 Best Sound Designer : Jayadevan Chakkadeth 
 Best Colourist : Vista VFX Lab

Festivals 
 Official selection. Montreal International film festival, Canada. September 2016.
 Official Selection. Main Competition section of Eurasia Film festival, Almaty, Kazakhstan. September 2016
 Official Selection. Competition section of Asia Pacific screen awards, Australia. November 2016
 Official selection, International competition section, International film festival, Kerala, December 2016
 Official selection, International competition, Arica Nativa film festival, Chile, November 2016
 Official selection, International competition, Jogja NETPAC Film festival, Indonesia, December 2016
 Official selection, Indian Panorama, International film festival of India, November 2016
 Official selection, Indian International film festival of Queensland, Australia 2017. 
 Official selection, New York Indian Film Festival, USA, April 2017.
 Official selection, Indian Competition, Bangalore International Film Festival, India, February 2017.
 Official selection, ImagineIndia International film festival Madrid, Spain, April 2017.
 Official selection, Roundglass International Environmental Film Festival Bangalore, October 2017.
 Official selection, Edmonton International Film Festival, Canada, July 2017.
 Bhubaneswar Film Festival, India, February 2018
 Bangalore International Centre Film Festival, India, January 2018

References

External links 
 

Films that won the Best Audiography National Film Award
2016 films
2010s Malayalam-language films